Kevin Bookout (born March 16, 1983) is an American former professional basketball player. Born in Stroud, Oklahoma, he attended Stroud High School where he competed in basketball, baseball, shot put and discus. He played college basketball for the Oklahoma Sooners as he wanted to attend a college with quality basketball and track-and-field programs. While with the Sooners basketball team, Bookout scored 1,018 points and pulled in 682 rebounds. He also participated on the track team and appeared in the 2007 NCAA finals in shot put. 

Bookout aspired to earn a spot on the United States shot put team for the 2008 Olympics but delayed his efforts until the 2012 Olympics. He instead played basketball professionally with the Rio Grande Valley Vipers in 2007.

Bookout worked out for the New York Jets of the National Football League (NFL) in 2012.

References

External links
Player Profile @ ESPN.com
Profile @ scout.com
Profile @ NewsOK.com
College statistics

1983 births
Living people
American men's basketball players
Basketball players from Oklahoma
Oklahoma Sooners men's basketball players
Parade High School All-Americans (boys' basketball)
People from Lincoln County, Oklahoma
Power forwards (basketball)
Rio Grande Valley Vipers players
Track and field athletes from Oklahoma